Psekups is a rural locality (a khutor) in Adygeysk District of Adygea, Russia. The population was 907 as of 2018. There are 21 streets.

Geography 
The khutor is located on the left bank of the Bolshoy Dysh River, 7 km south of Adygeysk (the district's administrative centre) by road. Molkino is the nearest locality.

Ethnicity 
The khutor is inhabited by Circassians, Russians.

References 

Rural localities in Adygea District